Eastwood International School is a private international IB World School in Beirut, Lebanon.

History 
Initially called Eastwood College, the school was founded in 1973 by Amine M. Khoury in Kafarshima, Lebanon with the motto "Children, our Purpose, and our Future". During the Lebanese civil war, the school was relocated to an area on the outskirts of Beirut called Mansourieh where it has remained.

The campus in Mansourieh's name was changed in 2016 to Eastwood International School while the campus in Kafarshima is still known as Eastwood College.

Accreditation 
The school is accredited by AdvancED and is an experiential continuum International Baccalaureate World School offering the PYP, MYP and IBDP classes.

Academic programs 
Eastwood International School is authorized in the IB Primary Years Programme and the IB Diploma Programme. The school is still in the candidacy phase for the IB Middle Years Programme. The PYP programme is offered in both English and French 

The early years classes follow the PYP and Reggio Emilia approach to education.

EIS (formally known as Eastwood College) led Lebanese schools in integrating technology throughout its educational environment, in many aspects of the curriculum replacing physical books with interactive books on tablets.

Campus Facilities

Eastwood International School campus is situated on the hills overlooking Beirut. The campus consists of 3 buildings which house the Early Years and Elementary (both English and French sections), Middle School, and High school classes respectively.

Facilities include an auditorium, a science lab, and ICT lab and a library. A guidance counselor is available every day.

References

External links 
 
 Eastwood College

International schools in Beirut
International Baccalaureate schools in Lebanon